Alfred Stanley Dudley McKenzie (30 August 1896 – 13 September 1985) was an Australian rules footballer who played with Collingwood and Hawthorn in the Victorian Football League (VFL).

Early life
The son of Archibald McKenzie and Martha McKenzie, nee Bardsley, Alfred Stanley Dudley McKenzie was born 30 August 1896.

McKenzie grew up on a farm in Myamyn near Heywood, Victoria but later moved to Melbourne. He enlisted in 1915 and fought in World War I before returning to Australia two years later.

Football
In 1919 he crossed to North Melbourne in the Victorian Football Association where he played for two seasons. In 1921 he joined Hawthorn where he became a stalwart of that club's final three seasons in the VFA, winning its Most Consistent Player Trophy in 1922. McKenzie played every game for Hawthorn in their first VFL season in 1925. A talented and hard to beat half-back, he became the first ever Hawthorn player to gain selection for a Victorian team in 1925. He retired at the end of the 1925 season.

Later life
In 1919 Stan McKenzie married Nellie May Walsh and they had three children. He continued his football involvement as coach of the Auburn Football Club and worked as a postman. 

Stan McKenzie died in 1985, aged 89, and was buried at Coburg Pine Ridge Cemetery.

Notes

External links 

Stan McKenzie's playing statistics from The VFA Project
Stan McKenzie's profile from Collingwood Forever

1896 births
1985 deaths
Australian rules footballers from Victoria (Australia)
Australian military personnel of World War I
Collingwood Football Club players
North Melbourne Football Club (VFA) players
Hawthorn Football Club (VFA) players
Hawthorn Football Club players